Epic Rap Battles of History (ERB) is a YouTube web series and music project created by Peter "Nice Peter" Shukoff and Lloyd "EpicLLOYD" Ahlquist. The series pits historical and pop culture figures against one another in a rap battle format. The characters portrayed are often determined by suggestions from viewers in the comments sections of the channel's videos. Shukoff and Ahlquist write each song themselves, researching the subject in order to find obscure details to use as references in the lyrics, although certain Patreon subscribers have also contributed to the writing process. As of February 23, 2023, the channel has 14.9 million subscribers and approximately 4 billion total video views. Following an extended hiatus, the channel returned with a bonus battle in December 2018, and the sixth season debuted on April 20, 2019.

The popularity of the music videos has led to mainstream partnerships, such as with Ubisoft, using the "Blackbeard vs Al Capone" episode to promote Assassin's Creed IV: Black Flag. Additionally, "Terminator vs Robocop" in the fourth season was used to promote the upcoming release of the film Terminator Genisys and featured an appearance by Arnold Schwarzenegger. ERB's popularity has also led to collaboration with mainstream artists. Shukoff and Ahlquist also created a two-minute rap battle scene used in The SpongeBob Movie: Sponge Out of Water.

Although early episodes of the series featured only Shukoff and Ahlquist, later episodes have regularly featured guest appearances, and other internet celebrities such as Dan Bull, Lisa Donovan, Timothy DeLaGhetto, George Watsky, DeStorm Power, Jesse Wellens, PewDiePie, Jenna Marbles, Lilly Singh, Ray William Johnson, Rhett and Link, and Smosh. Media celebrities like musicians Snoop Dogg, Chali 2na, T-Pain, Jackie Tohn and "Weird Al" Yankovic, actors J.B. Smoove and Gary Anthony Williams, and the comedy duo Keegan-Michael Key and Jordan Peele have also appeared in the series.

On July 3, 2013, "Barack Obama vs. Mitt Romney" became the first of its singles to be certified Gold by the Recording Industry Association of America (RIAA) in the United States. 10 other singles, "Adolf Hitler vs. Darth Vader", "Albert Einstein vs. Stephen Hawking", "Dr. Seuss vs. William Shakespeare", "Master Chief vs. Leonidas", "Steve Jobs vs. Bill Gates", "Justin Bieber vs. Ludwig van Beethoven", "Mario Brothers vs. Wright Brothers", "Mr. T vs. Mr. Rogers", "Abe Lincoln vs. Chuck Norris", and "Adolf Hitler vs. Darth Vader 2", were subsequently certified Gold as well.

History 

The idea for historical figures rapping against each other was conceived by Ahlquist, who pitched the idea to Shukoff as an improvised show titled "Check OneTwo"; both were working in improv at the time along with Zach Sherwin, who would later become a regular guest on the series. They were met with high levels of difficulty at first and decided that the concept would fare much better as a YouTube series than an improv show. The first three rap battles were each shot on a $50 budget.

Before the web series existed on YouTube, Shukoff and Ahlquist recorded their first song, which was a battle between Child's Play antagonist Chucky and actor Michael J. Fox. The song was freestyle and poorly made; as a result, it was not released to the public.

On September 26, 2010, the first rap battle was uploaded to YouTube, featuring Shukoff as John Lennon and Ahlquist as Bill O'Reilly. The 15th episode, "Nice Peter vs EpicLLOYD", marked the end of the first season. This battle pitted Ahlquist and Shukoff against each other with cameos from all of the characters they had played over the 14 prior episodes. At the end of the battle, KassemG arrives and convinces Peter and Lloyd to continue the battles on their own channel. Epic Rap Battles of History later returned on December 8, 2011, hosted on their new channel (moving from Shukoff's personal channel), ERB, with behind-the-scenes videos on their second channel, ERB2. Shukoff and Maker Studios also created the official website for the series, where fans could vote on winners for each video, and read short comical autobiographies by each character.

On September 27, 2012, following a four-month pause after the "Steve Jobs vs. Bill Gates" episode, a video was released on the series' YouTube channel where Ahlquist (voicing to an animation of Theodore Roosevelt) announced that new episodes would be released every two weeks until the Christmas holidays, starting with the 22nd episode "Frank Sinatra vs. Freddie Mercury" (aired on October 1, 2012). "Moses vs. Santa Claus", aired on December 10, 2012, was the last battle before taking a break for the holidays.

On February 17, 2013, Epic Rap Battles of History was nominated for five Streamy Awards, winning four of them. Shukoff and Ahlquist also performed part of the "Steve Jobs vs. Bill Gates" battle live.

On September 9, 2013, ERB uploaded a trailer video on their channel announcing that Epic Rap Battles of History would return on October 7, 2013 for a third season. On October 14, ERB released a second video with Ahlquist voicing Theodore Roosevelt, who announced the upcoming season's schedule. The third season went on hiatus after the release of "Donald Trump vs. Ebenezer Scrooge" on December 19, 2013. In March 2014, an episode of Shukoff's weekly show The Monday Show, published on March 11, and a third announcement video of Epic Rap Battles of History News, published on March 18, confirmed that Season 3 would continue on May 5, 2014. "Weird" Al Yankovic, Smosh, and Rhett and Link were also confirmed as guest appearances. The third season concluded with the release of "Artists vs. TMNT" on July 14, 2014, where the Teenage Mutant Ninja Turtles battled their European renaissance artist namesakes.

On September 30, 2014, a teaser video for the fourth season of Epic Rap Battles of History, featuring the Ghostbusters and MythBusters, was released; the series returned on November 10, 2014 with its 46th episode, "Ghostbusters vs. Mythbusters". This season also marked the first animated battle: "Zeus vs Thor", which was animated entirely with Lego bricks and minifigures; Forrest Whaley served as animation director. On December 15, 2014, when "Steven Spielberg vs. Alfred Hitchcock" was released, the fourth season went on hiatus. The season continued on May 25, 2015 and concluded with the release of the season finale, "Jim Henson vs. Stan Lee", on August 3, 2015.

It was confirmed in a podcast by Shukoff that there would be a fifth season, with pre-production starting in November 2015 once they came back from the world tour.

On December 16, the first off-season battle was released, entitled, "Deadpool vs. Boba Fett."

On February 26, 2016, it was announced that Season 5 would begin on May 2, 2016, and on March 22 it was announced that production had begun.

Season 5 officially began on May 2, 2016, with the release of the first battle of the season, "George R. R. Martin vs. J. R. R. Tolkien". ERB released battles every other Monday as of the first half of Season 5. On July 12, 2016, "Alexander the Great vs. Ivan the Terrible" was released. This marked the midseason break. Ahlquist later confirmed they were planning to return mid to late October. Filming began for the second half of Season 5 on September 23. On October 26, Season 5 resumed with "Donald Trump vs. Hillary Clinton". The final episode of Season 5, "Nice Peter vs EpicLLOYD 2" was released on January 9, 2017, where Ahlquist and Shukoff battle against each other once again, as it is a sequel to the Season 1 finale. Following the fifth season, ERB went on an extended hiatus.

In 2016, Epic Rap Battles of History was nominated for an Emmy Award in the newly initiated category Primetime Emmy Award for Outstanding Short Form Variety Series at the 68th Primetime Emmy Awards.

In 2018, Shukoff announced there would be a sixth season during a performance at Anime Midwest. On November 30, 2018, a video was posted on the official ERB YouTube channel, confirming that Season 6 would premiere in 2019. A "bonus battle" between Elon Musk and Mark Zuckerberg was released on December 7, 2018. In December 2018, Ahlquist said that they had gone "fully independent" of their production company.

On April 20, 2019, the Season 6 premiere ("Freddy Krueger vs Wolverine") was released. ERB once again went on hiatus in December, after "Thanos vs J. Robert Oppenheimer".
After a 10 month hiatus, ERB returned, with their third election rap battle, "Donald Trump vs Joe Biden". On December 5, 2020, Ahlquist stated in a Behind The Scenes video for their next battle, "Harry Potter vs Luke Skywalker" (their second Lego-animated collaboration with Forrest Whaley), that as a result of the COVID-19 pandemic, ERB would be transitioning from Season 6 to Season 7 earlier than expected, rather than further postpone Season 6. Several planned battles and concepts would be holdovers from Season 6. On May 28, 2021, the ERB Twitter account announced a new episode to be released on June 14, featuring EpicLLOYD as legendary Viking hero Ragnar Lodbrok and NicePeter as English King Richard the Lionheart. The episode was sponsored by the video game Rise of Kingdoms.
On November 27, 2021, ERB released a new rap battle episode, titled Jeff Bezos vs Mansa Musa on their YouTube channel. This was followed by the first “three-way” battle in the show’s history (“John Wick vs John Rambo vs John McClane”) on December 18, 2021. The next episode, “Lara Croft vs Indiana Jones”, released on October 26, 2022.

Cast

Main cast

Peter "Nice Peter" Shukoff

Lloyd "EpicLLOYD" Ahlquist

Recurring cast

Guest appearances 

Season 1

Season 2

Season 3

Season 4

Bonus Battle

Season 5

Season 6

Unreleased

Season 7

Episodes

Awards and nominations

See also 
Epic Rap Battles of History discography

References

External links 
Official website
Official forums

 
2010 web series debuts
Episode list using the default LineColor
Maker Studios channels
Streamy Award-winning channels, series or shows
YouTube channels launched in 2011
2010s YouTube series
2020s YouTube series
Bangsian fantasy